Rouina District is a district of Aïn Defla Province, Algeria.

Municipalities
Rouina
Zeddine
El Maine

Districts of Aïn Defla Province